Nasrullah Memon (born 2 March 1978) is a Pakistani first-class cricketer who plays for Hyderabad.

References

External links
 

1978 births
Living people
Pakistani cricketers
Hyderabad (Pakistan) cricketers
People from Shikarpur District